Monophadnoides is a genus of common sawflies in the family Tenthredinidae. There are about eight described species in Monophadnoides.

Species
These eight species belong to the genus Monophadnoides:
 Monophadnoides geniculatus (Hartig) i c g
 Monophadnoides klausnitzeri (Muche, 1973) g
 Monophadnoides osgoodi Smith, 1969 b
 Monophadnoides pauper (Provancher, 1882) b
 Monophadnoides rubi (Harris, 1845) g b (raspberry sawfly)
 Monophadnoides ruficruris (Brullé, 1832) g
 Monophadnoides scytha (Konow, 1898) g
 Monophadnoides smithi Togashi, 1980 g
Data sources: i = ITIS, c = Catalogue of Life, g = GBIF, b = Bugguide.net

References

Further reading

External links

 

Tenthredinidae